The Sheriffs' Declaration Act (5 & 6 Will. IV, c. 28) was an Act of the Westminster parliament passed in 1835, which allowed individuals to take the office of sheriff without have to make the full declaration required by the Municipal Corporations Act. It was a part of the process of the emancipation of the Jews in the United Kingdom.

The issue which provoked the legislation had been recent the election of David Salomans as Sheriff of the City of London. As a Jew, he was unable to state the required final words "and I make this Declaration upon the true Faith of a Christian". The Sheriffs' Declaration Act removed this requirement and he became sheriff.

In order to become Lord Mayor of London at a later date, Salomans would also need to have been an alderman.  He was elected to this position too in 1835, but no further relief was provided until the Municipal Offices Act 1845 (8 & 9 Vict., c. 52).  Salomans finally became an alderman in 1847 and Lord Mayor in 1855, and in 1859 was sworn in as a member of parliament where he had faced the same issue.

References

Jewish English history
Sheriffs of the City of London
Sheriffs